Maurizio Brucchi (born 21 September 1961 in Teramo) is an Italian politician.

He was a member of the centre-right party The People of Freedom and was elected Mayor of Teramo during the 2009 Italian local elections and took office on 8 June 2009. He was re-elected for a second term at the 2014 elections. He resigned on 4 December 2017 after an internal government crisis and left office on 6 December.

References

External links
 

1961 births
Living people
Mayors of Teramo
Forza Italia (2013) politicians
The People of Freedom politicians
21st-century Italian politicians
University of L'Aquila alumni